Annette Fellows (born 8 April 1955) is an Australian former cricketer who played primarily as a right-handed batter. She appeared in three Test matches and three One Day Internationals for Australia in 1984. She played domestic cricket for South Australia.

References

External links
 
 
 Annette Fellows at southernstars.org.au

Living people
1955 births
Cricketers from Adelaide
Australia women Test cricketers
Australia women One Day International cricketers
South Australian Scorpions cricketers